Mathew Drew Turner ("Mat" for short) (born 18 January 1988) is a South African born rugby union player who currently plays for the Seattle Seawolves in Major League Rugby (MLR).

He also played rugby sevens for England on the Sevens World Series circuit between 2008 and 2013. He usually plays as a wing or fullback.

Career

Youth / Varsity Cup

Turner was born in Cape Town, South Africa. He attended Western Province Preparatory School in Claremont and then Bishops College. He was a member of the 2006 Bishops first XV which also included Nick Köster and Martin Muller; he finished as the top scorer in school rugby the country during 2006, scoring 286 points in 20 matches, which included 28 tries. He was overlooked for provincial selection, however, not being included in 's squad for the 2006 Craven Week competition.

After finishing high school, he joined the Western Province Academy and represented the  side during the 2007 Under-19 Provincial Championship.

In 2008, he was included in the  team that played in the inaugural edition of the Varsity Cup competition. He started all of their remaining seven matches in the competition, scoring a total of nine tries to finish as the top try scorer in the competition. His try-scoring feat also included a hat-trick against  and he contributed a further seven points with the boot to finish sixth in the overall points scoring charts.

He was also selected in a South African Under-20 training squad at the start of 2008, but eventually failed to make the final squad that participated at the 2008 IRB Junior World Championship in Wales.

In the latter half of 2008, he was a member of the  squad that played in the 2008 Under-21 Provincial Championship.

Bristol

Towards the end of 2008, Turner moved to England to join Premiership side Bristol. He made his first class debut for the side in the 2008–09 Anglo-Welsh Cup. He started on the left wing in their first round match against the Northampton Saints and took just three minutes to score his first try for the club. He also scored a second midway through the first half, but could not prevent Bristol falling to a 17–30 defeat. He also played in their other two matches in the competition, but ended on the losing side on all three occasions.

He also made his debut in the English Premiership against Northampton Saints, coming on as a second-half substitute to help Bristol achieve their first Premiership win, beating Northampton 14–13. He also played in matches against Saracens and Wasps in the same competition. He made a further five appearances for the side following their relegation to the 2009–10 RFU Championship and scored two tries, taking his total number of appearances for the side to eleven.

Southern Kings

He made an appearance for the newly formed South African Super Rugby franchise, the Port Elizabeth-based , in their first ever match on 16 June 2009 against the British & Irish Lions during their 2009 tour to South Africa, with the Kings losing the match 8–20.

England Sevens

Turner qualified to play internationally for England through an English mother and was selected for the England sevens team for the first two legs of the 2009–10 IRB Sevens World Series. He immediately established himself as a regular in the England setup and eventually went on to play a total of 34 Sevens World Series tournaments between 2009 and 2013, scoring 92 tries.

In 2012, Turner was nominated for the IRB Sevens Player of the Year award. He made the final shortlist of three with New Zealanders Tomasi Cama and Frank Halai. Cama won the award.

Western Province

He wasn't included in their final squad for the competition, instead representing  in the 2015 Vodacom Cup.

Seattle Seawolves

In 2018, Turner played for the Seattle Seawolves in the first Major League Rugby season, and was awarded the Virginia Mason Alpha Back of the final championship match where the Seattle Seawolves won the championship and taking home the MLR shield.

Sri Lanka
In 2013/14 Turner played for the Central Kings in Sri Lanka at the Carlton International 7s tournament.

Coaching
In August 2015 he was appointed as the head coach of the Sri Lanka national rugby sevens team.

References

1988 births
Living people
Bristol Bears players
Commonwealth Games rugby sevens players of England
England international rugby sevens players
English rugby union players
Expatriate rugby union players in the United States
Rugby sevens players at the 2010 Commonwealth Games
Rugby union fullbacks
Rugby union players from Cape Town
Rugby union wings
Seattle Seawolves players
South African expatriate rugby union players
South African expatriate sportspeople in the United States
South African people of British descent
South African rugby union players
Western Province (rugby union) players